Lady Strikers Football Club is a Ghanaian professional women's football club based in Cape Coast in the Central Region of Ghana. The club features in the Ghana Women’s Premier League. The club is sponsored by Sanford World Clinic.

Grounds 
The club plays their home matches at the Robert Mensah Sports Stadium.

Notable players 

 Gladys Amfobea
 Ellen Coleman (Team captain 2021–)

References

External links 

 Official Website
 Lady Strikers on Facebook

Women's football clubs in Ghana